IGB may refer to:
 Inner German border, the former frontier between West Germany and the German Democratic Republic (East Germany)
 Integrated Genome Browser, a genome browser
 Carl R. Woese Institute for Genomic Biology, a genomics research facility at University of Illinois in Urbana-Champaign, United States
 Institute for Genomics and Bioinformatics, a research facility at the University of California Irvine, United States 
 igb: Intel Gigabit Ethernet driver software
 Irish Greyhound Board, the English language name for the Bord na gCon
 Gas Interconnector Greece–Bulgaria, is a natural gas pipeline between Greek and Bulgaria
 Leibniz-Institut für Gewässerökologie und Binnenfischere, also known as the Leibniz Institute of Freshwater Ecology and Inland Fisheries